Ross Andrew Fitzgerald  (born in 1944) is an Australian academic, historian, novelist, secularist, and political commentator. Fitzgerald is an Emeritus Professor in History and Politics at Griffith University. He has published forty-three books, including three histories of Queensland, two biographies, works about Labor Party politics of the 1950s, with other books relating to philosophy, alcohol and Australian Rules football, as well as eight works of fiction, including seven political/sexual satires about his corpulent anti-hero Professor Dr Grafton Everest.

In 2018 Ross Fitzgerald published the Grafton Everest sexual/political satire So Far, So Good : An entertainment. In 2019, he published the Grafton Everest adventure The Dizzying Heights and in March 2020, his memoir Fifty Years Sober. In November 2021 he published the eighth Grafton Everest adventure, The Lowest Depths. All these books are published by Hybrid in Melbourne.

Fitzgerald was an alcoholic who admitted in his memoirs, My Name is Ross: An Alcoholic's Journey and Fifty Years Sober, to consuming excessive alcohol between the ages of 15 and 24 years, when he took his last drink. He has now been sober for  years.

At the 2016 federal election Fitzgerald was a candidate for the Australian Senate representing the state of New South Wales, standing for the Australian Sex Party, which is now renamed The Reason Party.

Biography
Born in Melbourne, Victoria on Christmas Day 1944, Fitzgerald was awarded his PhD in political theory from the University of New South Wales. His academic career has included appointments at Griffith University as a Lecturer between 1977 and 1986, a Senior Lecturer/Associate Professor between 1987 and 1996, and a Personal Chair between 1996 and 2002. In 2002 Fitzgerald was appointed as Professor in History and Politics.

During his time as an Australian Research Council Senior Research Fellow from 1992 to 1996, as well as writing two political biographies Professor Fitzgerald co-produced two ABCTV documentaries, also about E.G. ("Red Ted") Theodore and Australia's only Communist Party member of parliament, Fred Paterson.

Fitzgerald writes regular columns and book reviews for The Weekend Australian, The Australian, the Sydney Morning Herald, The Age and The Canberra Times. He also appears on ABC Radio, ABC Television, the Alan Jones Show, SkyNews, and Channel 7 and is a regular guest speaker at The Sydney Institute.

In addition to his academic and political commentary appointments, Fitzgerald has served as the Chair of Centenary of Federation Queensland between 1999 and 2002, a Judge of the Prime Minister's Literary Award for Non Fiction and Australian History, a member of the New South Wales Civil and Administrative Tribunal (NCAT) from 2012 to 2016, a member of the Australian Government's Expert Advisory Group on Drugs and Alcohol between 2000 and 2013, a member of the New South Wales Heritage Council between 2003 and 2009, a member of the New South Wales Parole Board between 2002 and 2012, a member of Administrative Decisions Tribunal of New South Wales between 2002 and 2012, and a member of the Queensland Parole Board between 1997 and 2002.

Fitzgerald is a life member of the Australian Republic Movement.

In 2014 Fitzgerald as appointed a Member in the Order of Australia (AM) for significant service to education in the field of politics and history as an academic, and to community and public health organisations. His 2015 book, Going out backwards: a Grafton Everest adventure was shortlisted for the 2017 Russell Prize for Humour Writing.

Published works
Fitzgerald has  published 43 books, including the following titles:

, which was short-listed for the NSW Premier's Prize and for the National Biography Award.
, awarded the Eros Foundation erotic novel of the year in 1994.

, about Fred Paterson.

, a book about Australian rules football.
 Going out backwards was shortlisted for the 2017 Russell Prize for Humour Writing.

Television and film documentaries 

In development

References

External links
 Personal website
 My Name is Ross: An Alcoholic's Journey
 Soaring

1944 births
Living people
Australian historians
20th-century Australian novelists
21st-century Australian novelists
Australian male novelists
Australian political scientists
Australian screenwriters
Australian Sex Party politicians
Australian people of Irish descent
People from Queensland
Writers from Sydney
University of New South Wales alumni
Historians of Australia
Australian male screenwriters
20th-century Australian male writers
21st-century Australian male writers
Quadrant (magazine) people